El Patron de la Vereda is an Argentine telenovela, filmed in 2005 for América TV. Written by Enrique Torres and Miguel Vega, produced by Raúl Lecouna and directed by Jorge Oneglia and Carlos Dell Aguila. It was starred by Gustavo Bermúdez and Camila Bordonaba. The antagonists were Víctor Laplace, Martín Seefeld, Lucrecia Blanco and Emilia Mazer.

Plot 
Gastón Amilcar Alberti (Gustavo Bermúdez) one of the richest heirs in the country, son of a powerful businessman who owns a multimedia. Gastón will be in charge of the popular music division of his father's record company. Gastón Alberti is living his last single days. He will marry María Pía Bernasconi (Lucrecia Blanco). It is a suitable marriage for both families and that has the support of all. One night his friends organize a bachelor party. At the party there is a singer whom Gastón's friends ignore, but he does not. As soon as he hears the first chords, he recognizes the song, the song that he wrote to his high school girlfriend, his great love, he looks at the small stage and there he sees her, Graciela. Sisí Ponte (Camila Bordonaba) is a young woman with character, who knows very well what she wants, a fighter who wants to be a singer. She lives with Doña Aurora (Hilda Bernard) her grandmother, an administrator of a neighborhood pension. To support herself, Sisí works at a hamburger joint by day and singing at the pub by night. Sisí will perform a song that Gastón had composed 18 years ago for his girlfriend at the time. Gastón will discover that the young woman is nothing less than the daughter of the woman he had been in love with 18 years ago. Graciela baptizes her daughter with her nickname. The meeting at the Pub will make their lives change forever, despite the age difference between the two, Sisi falls in love and will achieve Gastón that a true love is born, the first love for both of them. Although they will not have it easy, since everyone will be against this relationship, except for Mercedes Alberti (Ximena Fassi), Gastón's sister, Catalina (Paola Sallustro), Sisí's best friend and Lalo (Marcelo Cosentino), Gastón's best friend will be the only allies to fight against everyone's maneuvers to separate them. But fate will put obstacles in the way that they must overcome to achieve complete happiness.

Cast

Protagonists 
 Gustavo Bermúdez as Gastón Amilcar Alberti
 Camila Bordonaba as Sisí Ponte

Main Cast 
 Víctor Laplace as Franco Alberti
 Martín Seefeld as Bernardo Bernasconi
 Hilda Bernard as Doña Aurora
 Ximena Fassi as Mercedes Alberti
 Lucrecia Blanco as María Pía Bernasconi
 Emilia Mazer as Isabel González de Alberti
 Paola Sallustro as Catalina
 Diana Lamas as Verónica
 Marcelo Cosentino as Lalo
 Segundo Cernadas as Javier
 Gino Renni as Carmelo
 María José Gabin as Arlinda
 Nicolás Scarpino as Mario
 Luis Mazzeo as Papin
 Anabel Cherubito as Chelita
 Marcelo Serre as Nabuco

Antagonists 
 Víctor Laplace as Franco Alberti
 Martín Seefeld as Bernardo Bernasconi
 Lucrecia Blanco as María Pía Bernasconi
 Emilia Mazer as Isabel González de Alberti

Participations 
 Silvina Luna as Lucy Ferita
 Jazmín Beccar Varela as Maggie
 Nicolás Riera as Student
 Celina Font as Silvana Rivas
 Pablo Heredia as Román
 María Roji as Alicia
 Diego Child as Ernesto
 Solange Verina as Aylén
 Maite Zumelzú as Candela 
 Sebastián Mogordoy
 Germán Tripel

References

External links 
 El Patrón de la Vereda at the Internet Movie Database

2005 telenovelas
2005 Argentine television series debuts
2005 Argentine television series endings
Argentine telenovelas
América TV original programming
Spanish-language telenovelas